Antarctic cycling expeditions were made possible with the development of fatbikes: fat tired bicycles designed for riding in snow and sand.

Expeditions
Expeditions in order of distance cycled.

Doug Stoup was the first person to undertake a cycling expedition in Antarctica. In January 2003 he rode  on a specially designed "ice bike" around the Patriot Hills.

In 2012, Helen Skelton became the first person to reach the South Pole using a bicycle. The bike was custom built for her trip with 8-inch-wide (20 cm) tires. She also used skis and a kite to help her pull a sled containing  of supplies. Some of Skelton's claims have been challenged.

In December 2012, Eric Larsen made the first attempt to undertake an expedition solely by bicycle to the South Pole. After covering , a quarter of the distance to the South Pole, Larsen abandoned his attempt and cycled an additional  back to Patriot Hills. On 27 December 2013, Maria Leijerstam became the first person to cycle from the coast of Antarctica to the South Pole. Leijerstam's achievement was criticized for excessive motorized support.

Juan Menéndez Granados, calling himself "Juan Sin Miedo", started his bicycle and ski expedition at Hercules Inlet in December 2013 and finished on January 17, 2014. He traveled the full distance without being resupplied, surviving the last 4 days of the expedition drinking chocolate powder and sunflower oil. When it was not possible to progress by cycling, he used skis to make progress. He became the first person to cycle to the South Pole solo, unsupported and unassisted.

Daniel Burton attempted a solo cycling expedition to the South Pole later in 2014, although there were four caches of food staged along the route, as well as an equipment cache. Burton traveled the full distance pedaling or pushing his bike (without skis such as Menéndez used). His effort took 5 days longer than Menéndez'.

References

Cycling by continent
Antarctic expeditions
History of cycling
Antarctic cycling expeditions